Austromyrtus is a genus of shrubs in the myrtle family Myrtaceae. Three species are found along the east coast of Australia; in Queensland and in New South Wales and A. lotoides being endemic to New Caledonia. The fruits of A. dulcis have a hint of cinnamon flavouring. The species under this generic name in New Caledonia are being taxonomically revised and will be transferred to another genus.

Many species formerly classified in Austromyrtus are now placed in the genera Gossia and Lenwebbia.  The species formerly known as Austromyrtus lasioclada, which is common in northern New South Wales and south-eastern Queensland, is now known as Lenwebbia lasioclada.

Species include:

Austromyrtus dulcis 
Austromyrtus glabra
Austromyrtus lotoides
Austromyrtus tenuifolia

References

 
Myrtaceae genera